Tashfin ibn Ali (died 23 March 1145, or 25 March 1145 CE; Arabic : تاشفين بن علي ) was the 6th Almoravid Emir, he reigned in 1143–1145.

Biography
Tashfin ibn Ali was appointed Governor of Granada and Almería in 1129, as well as of Córdoba in 1131, during the reign of his father Ali ibn Yusuf. He succeeded his father in 1143. In 1145, he went to fight the Almohads, under the leadership of Abd al-Mu'min, in the Oran area. He was besieged for several days by the Almohad forces and finally opted for escaping by sea. He subsequently called on a fleet from Almeria, burned his military encampment and while trying to join the port by night on horseback, he fell off a cliff in the Atlas Mountains and died in March 1145. He was succeeded first by his son Ibrahim ibn Tashfin, who was still an infant, and soon after by his brother Ishaq ibn Ali.

References

1145 deaths
Almoravid emirs
Muslims of the 1113–1115 Balearic Islands expedition
People from Marrakesh
12th-century Moroccan people
Year of birth unknown
Deaths by horse-riding accident
12th-century Berber people